Sorkheh Kamran (also Romanized as Sorkheh Kamrān; also known as Sorkheh Karān) is a village in Minjavan-e Sharqi Rural District, Minjavan District, Khoda Afarin County, East Azerbaijan Province, Iran. At the 2006 census, its population was 38, in 8 families. The village is populated by the Kurdish Mohammad Khanlu tribe.

References 

Populated places in Khoda Afarin County
Kurdish settlements in East Azerbaijan Province